Jochen Sandig (* born 5 January 1968 in Esslingen) is a German cultural entrepreneur and founder of four cultural institutions in Berlin.

Biography
Jochen Sandig has lived in Berlin since 1989. In 1990 he was involved in the founding of the Kunsthaus Tacheles. From 1990 to 1994 he was chairman of the Board of the Tacheles eV for both financing and operation as well as responsible for the artistic program.

In 1993, together with Sasha Waltz he founded the international dance ensemble Sasha Waltz & Guests. In 1996 he founded the Sophiensaele in Berlin as a new production facility for independent theater and dance, serving as the Artistic Director until 1999. In 1999 Sandig joined the Schaubühne with Sasha Waltz, where he worked together with her until 2004 as a member of the artistic directors. In 2006 he founded, together with music manager Folkert Uhde, the cultural institution "Radialsystem V - New Space for the Arts" in Berlin, which was opened in early September 2006.

In January 2010 he was appointed Chevalier dans l'Ordre des Arts et des Lettres.  Knight of Arts and Letters

Jochen Sandig and his wife Sasha Waltz are parents of a son and a daughter.

References

1968 births
People from Esslingen am Neckar
Living people
Businesspeople from Berlin